Uam is the third music album by Scottish musician Julie Fowlis. It was released on 26 October 2009 in Europe and in March 2010 in Canada and the United States. The album features contributions from Eddi Reader, Phil Cunningham and Sharon Shannon among others. It is the first Fowlis album to contain English lyrics, contributed by Eddi Reader on a bilingual version of folk song Wind And Rain. The title of the album means "From me" in Scottish Gaelic.

Track listing

 M' fhearann saidhbhir
M' fhearann saidhbhir (My land is rich)
Nellie Garvey's
'G ioman nan gamhan 's mi muladach
Jerry's Pipe Jig
 Bothan Àirigh am Bràigh Raithneach (A sheiling on the Braes of Rannoch)
 Wind and Rain
 Thig am bàta (the boat will come)
 A Chatrion' Òg (Young Catriona)
 Hé gràdh, hò gràdh
 Cò nì mire rium?
Cò nì mire rium? (Who will flirt with me?)
Trip to Galway
 A' Chiad Cheum (The First Step)
 Brògan ùr agam a-nochd
Brògan ùr agam a-nochd (I have new shoes tonight)
The Cat and The Dog
Mu chuachag 's laghach thu (My beloved you are so nice)
 Rugadh mi 'teis meadhan na mara (Me zo ganet é kreiz er mor / I was born in the midst of the sea)
 Bodachan cha phòs mi
 A Mhic Dhùghaill 'ic Ruairidh (Son of Dougal, son of Ruairidh)
 Hò bha mi, hé bha mi (Hò I was, hè I was)

External links
 Julie Fowlis – official site with lyrics

Julie Fowlis albums
2009 albums